WLTW (106.7 FM) is an adult contemporary radio station licensed to New York City and serving the New York metropolitan area. WLTW is owned by iHeartMedia and broadcasts from studios in the former AT&T Building in the Tribeca neighborhood of Manhattan; its transmitter is located at the Empire State Building.

History
The station first went on the air on January 1, 1961, as non-commercial WRVR, originally owned by the Riverside Church. WRVR played classical music and some jazz, along with religious programming and public affairs, broadcasting from an antenna atop the church's bell tower.   As time went on, WRVR was a full-time jazz station with a strong audience following but low ratings.

In mid-1974 Riverside Church looked to cut its losses and sell WRVR, but with a preferred condition that the station's jazz format be preserved. At the same time, classical music-formatted WNCN (104.3 FM, now sister station WAXQ) was in the process of a controversial format change to Album oriented rock, with new call letters WQIV. A group of WNCN audience members formed the non-profit WNCN Listeners Guild and attempted to block the station's then-owner, Starr Broadcasting, from making the format switch. After their efforts failed, the WNCN Listeners Guild partnered with GAF Corporation and briefly entered negotiations with Riverside Church to purchase WRVR and switch its programming to classical. The rock format on 104.3 FM would last less than a year, as GAF announced it would purchase WQIV in July 1975 and restore 104.3 FM to its former call sign and programming.

As the WNCN/WQIV drama concluded, Sonderling Broadcasting stepped in and bought WRVR from Riverside Church for just over $2 million. Sonderling already owned WWRL (1600 AM), and hoped that it could move WWRL's Urban contemporary format to FM as a counter-move against WBLS (107.5 FM), which had cut into WWRL's ratings. Like the WNCN/WQIV situation, community opposition tried to stop sale of the station. Sonderling ultimately took control of WRVR in October 1976 after over a year of delays. The listeners' protests did prevent the proposed change, and WRVR remained a jazz station under Sonderling ownership. At that time it developed the precursor to what would later become known as the "smooth jazz" format.  While it played Jazz music, it was allowed to report to Radio & Records Album Oriented Rock chart in the mid to late 1970s.

1980s
In 1978 Viacom announced it was purchasing the Sonderling chain, a sale which took a year-and-a-half to become final. When Viacom took over in 1980, the call letters were changed to WKHK and the station adopted a country music format known as "Kick 106.7 FM". The format change took place in the middle of the night and brought many protests from New York jazz fans, who petitioned the FCC to deny the station's license renewal; ultimately the petition was denied. WKHK would suffer from low ratings, as they were unable to compete with WHN (1050 AM), which also had a country music format at the time.

On January 23, 1984, Viacom dropped country music and turned 106.7 into an MOR station–with new call letters WLTW and on-air branding of "Lite FM". Initially they were an easy listening station without anything that would be classified as "elevator music". At this point, the station played music from such artists as Barbra Streisand, Frank Sinatra, the Carpenters, Dionne Warwick, Kenny Rogers, Tony Bennett, Andy Williams, Barry Manilow, Simon & Garfunkel, James Taylor, and the Stylistics. The station also played softer songs from such artists as Elton John, Elvis Presley, the Beatles, the Everly Brothers, the Righteous Brothers and Billy Joel. The station would not play any new music except for new songs by artists that were familiar to listeners of the station. With this format change, ratings did increase from its previously low levels.

By the late 1980s, WLTW started to play songs from such artists as Whitney Houston, Chicago, Foreigner, the Doobie Brothers and Bruce Springsteen. As other competing New York City stations changed their focus, the station stayed with their soft adult contemporary format, even though they were phasing out songs from artists such as Frank Sinatra, Barry Manilow, and the Carpenters. At this point, the station's ratings were at or near the top compared with other New York City radio stations.

1990s
By the mid-1990s, with WPAT-FM adapting a Spanish adult contemporary format, WPLJ adapting a hot adult contemporary format, and WMXV switching to a modern adult contemporary format, WLTW segued to a mainstream adult contemporary format with a more uptempo direction than before, and phased out the majority of its soft adult contemporary material.

Merger with Clear Channel Communications

Chancellor bought WLTW and the rest of Viacom's radio group in 1997. In 1999 Chancellor merged with Capstar to form AMFM, which retained WLTW. Finally, in 2000, AMFM merged with Clear Channel Communications, which became iHeartMedia in 2014.

WLTW was simulcast nationwide on XM Satellite Radio from 2001 to the end of 2003, under the channel name "Lite."  WLTW on XM was replaced by The Blend on February 2, 2004.  In 2004, all XM music channels went commercial free, and WLTW was replaced with a unique-to-XM channel called Sunny, which had an easy listening format. Since then, Clear Channel has regained the right to air commercials on their XM music channels. Sunny then began carrying commercials, but was still exclusive to XM. After a few format tweaks, Sunny played soft oldies until it became The Pink Channel.

Like-other Lite FM-branded and iHeartMedia-owned mainstream AC stations, during the holiday season (Thanksgiving through Christmas), WLTW has played Christmas music interspersed with its regular playlist.  Only on Christmas Day and a few days leading up to it would the station devote all its airtime to holiday music.  After the September 11 attacks, Christmas music was seen as a comforting "feel-good" format for radio listeners.  Already established as a popular station for Christmas music, WLTW began to switch to an all-Christmas format earlier in 2002.  After retaining its leadership in market share, and as part of a national trend, the station continued to make the switch earlier in the following years. By 2004, the all-Christmas format ran from Thanksgiving through Christmas, and in 2005, it began on November 18, the week before Thanksgiving (November 24). By all accounts, the gamble paid off; WLTW captured 7.4% of the New York radio audience during the fall of 2005—the biggest market share in WLTW's history and the highest share for all New York stations since the winter of 1995. On November 18, 2006, for the 2nd year in a row, the station switched to all Christmas music on the Saturday before Thanksgiving, becoming the first station in the New York media market to do so. They did so the same day as WALK-FM, a Long Island-based station which shares a good portion of their listening audience. At some points during the 2008 holiday season, WLTW would draw as much as a third of all radio listeners in the New York area.

From 2007 to 2018, WLTW began airing Christmas music on the Friday before Thanksgiving. Beginning in 2019, the station began airing Christmas music on the second Friday before Thanksgiving.

Since 2006
As part of Clear Channel's nationwide cost-cutting efforts, WLTW fired station veterans Bill Buchner (mornings) and J.J. Kennedy (evenings) on November 6, 2006. Buchner was replaced with Karen Carson, who co-hosted mornings with fellow WLTW staffer Christine Nagy. WLTW Program Director Jim Ryan has denied these firings were part of the company's cost cutting that were going on at all the other Clear Channel stations in preparation for their conversion the leveraged buyout that took the company from public to private ownership in 2006, but rather from their desire to improve ratings.

The syndicated Delilah show, distributed by sister company Premiere Radio Networks, replaced Kennedy's local evening lovesongs show on November 20, 2006, bringing the syndicated show to the full New York market for the first time. Prior to WLTW picking her show up, Delilah was only heard in outer portions of the New York market from stations in neighboring areas, such as WEZN-FM. In a departure from her normal format, Delilah and her syndicator are allowing Ryan to program the music on the WLTW's version of Delilah, instead of the selections that are sent to her other affiliates.

On April 2, 2007, just after April Fool's Day, WLTW removed the "Lite" branding and was simply known as "New York's 106.7." This probably took place in reaction to the "Lite" brand being associated with an older demographic turning away the younger listeners, as well as increased competition from the new Fresh 102.7. Later in 2007, the Lite-FM branding returned on the station. This was true even though WLTW played "Livin' on a Prayer" by Bon Jovi and "Crazy" by Gnarls Barkley, just like with most AC stations today.  By 2009, most of the hot AC content was toned down in order for competitor WWFS' (now WNEW-FM) shift from hot AC to adult contemporary.  In 2011, WWFS switched panels to the hot adult contemporary panel from the adult contemporary panel on Nielsen BDS and later Mediabase, giving WWFS more format similarity to rival WPLJ (owned by Cumulus Media) rather than WLTW or its rimshot rivals (WFAS-FM/WFAF, WKJY or WMGQ, the latter two on 98.3 FM).

Further cost-cutting efforts by Clear Channel caused the departure of longtime station favorites Al "Bernie" Berstein and Valerie Smaldone in early 2008.  It was also announced that Program Director Jim Ryan would exit as of May 2008. Chris Conley took over the Program Director Position. Conley was a programming consultant with McVay Media and long-time programming veteran with years in the Adult Contemporary radio format.  Conley had a very successful tenure at WBEB B101 FM in Philadelphia. Recently, in addition to his programming duties at WLTW-FM, Conley has been overseeing programming at sister station WKTU The Beat Of New York. Morgan Prue, winner of several Music Director Of The Year Awards, stayed on as the station's Music Director and Assistant Program Director. Upon Prue's departure, to pursue a program directorship in Canada, Jill Kempton was named Assistant Program Director/Music Director. Kempton is now the program director of sister station WASH-FM in Washington DC. Cara Hahn has stepped into the Assistant Program Director role, which she also holds at New York sister station WHTZ.

Lite FM has evolved into a more upbeat "Variety" station from its earlier "Soft Rock" approach with deejays talking over intros, keeping a non-stop music flow, and has added a jingle package for the first time in the history of the station. The station uses Reelworld One AC with its own logo. The station is also well known for having somewhat of a lean toward Rhythmic AC compared to most other AC stations owned by Clear Channel, possibly due to the younger-leaning audience in the NY market.

In May 2011, WLTW returned to XM Satellite Radio, with a full-time simulcast on Channel 13.  However, station owner Clear Channel sold off its ownership stake in Sirius XM Radio during the second quarter of fiscal year 2013.  As a result of the sale, nine of Clear Channel's eleven XM stations, including the simulcast of WLTW, ceased broadcast over XM Satellite Radio on October 18, 2013.

In 2018, WLTW and eight other iHeart-owned AC stations began carrying the syndicated weekend program Ellen K Weekend Show hosted by KOST 103.5 Los Angeles radio personality and former On Air with Ryan Seacrest co-host Ellen K.

A link to 106.7 FM's days as Riverside Church-owned WRVR remains on WLTW in the present day. A recorded sermon from Riverside Church airs on the station at 5:00 AM on Sunday mornings, as part of WLTW's non-music public affairs programming.

Ratings
As a mainstream adult contemporary station, WLTW has historically been one of the top radio stations in New York City. In March 2012, the station finished first with a 7.5 share in the Nielsen Audio numbers, with WCBS-FM and WHTZ-FM finishing in second and third respectively.

WLTW's audience also grows when it switches to Christmas music for the holiday season; in 2017, the station's ratings share increased to 8.8 at the beginning of the season, an increase of .5 year-over-year.

References

External links
 

The WRVR-FM (Riverside Radio) Collection at the American Archive of Public Broadcasting

Mainstream adult contemporary radio stations in the United States
LTW
Radio stations established in 1961
1961 establishments in New York City
IHeartMedia radio stations